The 2018–19 Logan Cup was the 25th edition of the Logan Cup, a first-class cricket competition in Zimbabwe, that started on 3 December 2018. The tournament featured four teams, instead of the five that took part in the previous edition, with the Rising Stars being disbanded. The other change to the 2018–19 tournament was that it was being played across six rounds, instead of ten, as per previous years. Mountaineers were the defending champions.

In January 2019, the matches in the third round of fixtures were both called off, following fuel protests taking place in the country. In February 2019, Mountaineers retained their title, with a match left to play, after they beat Mashonaland Eagles by ten wickets. It was their third consecutive title.

Point table
The following teams competed:

 Champions

Fixtures

Round 1

Round 2

Round 3

Round 4

Round 5

Round 6

References

External links
 Series home at ESPN Cricinfo

Logan Cup
Logan Cup
Logan Cup
Logan Cup